SC Eendracht Aalst is a Belgian football club based in Aalst, East Flanders.

History 
During World War I, citizens from Aalst played football matches to raise money for prisoners of war. In 1919 Sport-Club Eendracht Aalst became an official football team. After some friendly games in 1923, SC Eendracht Aalst joined the regional competition. They quickly moved their way up through the regional divisions and after moving the stadium to the current location in 1928, the team made it into the national competition in 1932. Only seven years later, in 1939, Aalst were promoted to the Eredivisie (the current Belgian Pro League). Due to the second World War competition was not played for two years, so it wasn't until 1942 Aalst finished its first season in the Eredivisie. In 1946 the chairman died and it was decided to rename the stadium to honour him, from then on it was called the Pierre Cornelis Stadium.
That year was the beginning of a very dark period for Eendracht Aalst. Due to changes in the competition format, they were forced into relegation. After this they played in the lower division for more than 30 years. In 1960 they managed to get back into the Eredivisie, but in 1962 they ended last and were relegated again. In 1965, after a bribery affair, Aalst was relegated to the lowest national division. In 1977 they made it back into the second division, with Paul Van Himst in the team.
In 1994 the team finally joined the first division again. Jan Ceulemans (manager), Godwin Okpara and Gilles De Bilde were some of the most important factors towards success. In 1995 a new climax was reached when they were allowed to enter the European competition and even survived the first round against Levski Sofia.

It changed its name in 2002 after former Belgian First Division club K.S.C. Eendracht Aalst had gone into liquidation.  So they could not get the license and the new team began at the third division level.  They played the next two seasons in second division (2003–2005) and are now back to the third division and they are at the 3rd place.  While the 2004–05 championship was over, the club needed to know if first division side F.C. Brussels and second division side R.E. Virton were to receive the professional football license to know where they would play next season. While 17th K. Patro Maasmechelen had no license, they were obviously relegated.  So if one of the two submentionned clubs were refused the license, Aalst would have had played the third division playoffs while if they were both refused the license, Aalst would have remained in second division.  Finally, both clubs did receive it so the team was relegated. In 2011, the name of the team got changed back to S.C. Eendracht Aalst. They've also requested to change the name back to the former K.S.C. Eendracht Aalst, which will be possible in 2012, if they receive good advice from the Royal Belgian Football Association (RBFA).

Stadium 

The Pierre Cornelisstadion is located in Bredestraat, Aalst, near the city center.
The Stadium has a capacity of 4,500.
It was built in the early 1930s.

Honours 
Belgian Second Division Final Round:
Winners (2): 1991, 1994
Belgian Promotion B:
Champions: 2006–07
Belgian Third Division:
Champions: 2010–11

UEFA cup history

Current squad 
Updated 18 October 2022

Previous trainers 

 Jan Ceulemans
 Wim De Coninck
 Maurice De Schrijver
 Patrick De Wilde
 Etienne De Wispelaere
 Manu Ferrera
 Georges Heylens
 Urbain Haesaert
 Luc Limpens
 Alain Merckx
 Lorenzo Staelens
 Gilbert Bodart
 Gaston Van Der Elst
 Geert Van Roy
 Michel Verschueren (physical trainer)
 Laszlo Fazekas
 Henk Houwaert
 Barry Hulshoff
 Tomislav Ivic

Women football 
The female team of Eendracht Aalst plays currently in the Super League. and played his homematches in the Jeugdcentrum Zandberg.

References

External links 
 

Association football clubs established in 1919
Association football clubs established in 2002
Football clubs in Belgium
1919 establishments in Belgium
Sport in East Flanders
 
SC Eendracht Aalst
Belgian Pro League clubs